Coelognathus helena monticollaris is subspecies of nonvenomous constricting snake in the family Colubridae. The subspecies is native to the Western ghats of India.

Description
C. h. monticollaris is a narrow-headed slender snake with a beautiful colouration. The light brown body is adorned with black and white transverse stripes, unlike C. h. helena which has dark brown and white spots. The head is greenish brown with black markings. The true purpose of this colouration is camouflage. Recently, albinism has been reported in this subspecies.

Habitat
The preferred habitat of C. h. monticollaris is forests, but it may frequently venture towards human habitation and occasionally enter human dwellings.

Behaviour
C. h. monticollaris is diurnal and highly active. It has a very nasty temper and will strike repeatedly if molested. It never appreciates captivity and will resist capture with utmost tenacity until helplessly overpowered. Its bites are often very damaging due to its inward pointing teeth.

A  male specimen caught in Maharashtra, India (near Paud 09/16/13) whipped its tail when agitated.  The same specimen was easily handled and carried around the collector's neck without incident.

Diet
C. h. monticollaris feeds mainly on small mammals. It uses its camouflage to stalk its prey and initially disorients its victim with a blitz strike. It then surrounds its prey with its coils and weakens it by biting repeatedly. The victim is finally killed by constriction and swallowed at leisure. It may also prey upon birds, frogs, lizards and other snakes as well, but shows a high preference towards small mammals. It is notorious for its voracious appetite. Captive specimens prefer mice and tend to lose interest in lizards especially if the lizards remain motionless.

Breeding
Very little known about the reproductive habits of C. h. monticollaris. It is probably viviparous. Brood size unknown.

Growth
Females are longer than the males, while males have proportionately longer tails.

Venom
C. h. monticollaris is nonvenomous. It kills instead by constriction.

Identification
C. h. monticollaris may be identified by the following key characters:
Nine supralabials of which the fifth and sixth touch the eye.
19 to 21 rows of dorsal scales two head lengths before the vent.
Anal shield entire
Nearly equally sized frontal and parietal shields.

Lepidosis
Rostral: Compressed and touches six shields.
Frontal: Relatively thin and elongated.
Supraoculars: Slender and elongated being nearly as long as the frontal.
Parietals: Each individual shield is slightly larger than the frontal.
Prefrontals: Highly broad as well as long.
Internasals: Touch the nostrils.
Nasals: Divided along a vertical line on which the nostril is situated.
Loreals: One
Preoculars: One
Postoculars: Divided into two equally sized shields
Temporals: Divided into two equally sized elongated shields.
Supralabials: Nine of which the fifth and sixth touch the eye.
Mental: Stereotypic in form.
Infralabials: Six of which the sixth is the largest.
Chin shields: Anterior and posterior pairs equal in size, posterior pair separated from each other by smaller scales.
Dorsal scales: Only the ultimate row is enlarged.
Ventrals: 217 to 265
Anal Shield: Entire
Subcaudals: 74 to 97, divided.

Dentition
Maxillary: 19 to 25
Palatine: 10 to 14
Pterygoid: 15 to 30
Mandibular: 22 to 30

Geographic range
C. h. monticollaris is found in the Western Ghats of India. reported from Maharashtra, Goa, Karnataka, Kerala and Tamil Nadu.

References

External links

Further reading
Das I (2002). A Photographic Guide to Snakes and other Reptiles of India. Sanibel Island, Florida: Ralph Curtis Books. 144 pp. . (Coelognathus helena monticollaris, p. 32).
Schulz, Klaus-Dieter (1992). "Die geographischen Unterarten der Indischen Schmucknatter Elaphe helena (Daudin, 1803) ". Salamandra 28 (1): 14–24. (Elaphe helena monticollaris, new subspecies). (in German).

Rat snakes